Video Vixens (also known as Black Socks) is a 1975 sex comedy film written by Joel Gross and directed by Ron Sullivan under the pseudonym Henri Pachard. The crew features many of the cast from the 1972 horror film The Last House on the Left with Sandra Peabody and Steve Miner working as the script supervisor and assistant editor for the film. It stars Keith Luckett, James Walters, George Buck Flower, Con Covert, and Robyn Hilton. It is currently distributed by Troma Entertainment.

Premise
The plot follows the fictional television broadcast station WKLITT as they broadcast a stag film award show. The film is made up of several vignettes regarding the preparation of the show, clips from fictional movies, and parodies of commercials.

External links
Video Vixens at allmovie.com

1970s sex comedy films
1975 films
American sex comedy films
American independent films
Troma Entertainment films
1975 comedy films
1975 independent films
1970s English-language films
1970s American films